Sergey O. Macheret (born December 25, 1957) is an American physicist and aerospace engineer known for his contributions to plasma science and engineering. Macheret formulas for endothermic exchange reactions and Macheret-Fridman model of vibration-dissociation coupling are widely used for analysis of hypersonic and other chemically reacting flows.

Biography
Macheret received his PhD degree from Kurchatov Institute in 1985. He has been a professor at Purdue University School of Aeronautics and Astronautics since 2014.

Macheret formulas
The formulas are used for estimation of non-equilibrium rate coefficients of the simple-exchange endothermic reaction: . Such reactions appear in low-temperature nonequilibrium plasmas where substantial fraction of energy input goes into vibrational excitation of molecules.  The formulas are obtained by applying classical mechanics methods for high temperatures and semi-classical approximation for moderate temperatures.

Assumptions:

1.

2. Collisions are collinear and rotational energy effects are negligible.

3. The duration of collision is much faster than the period of molecule vibration.

4. The vibrational energy obeys Boltzmann distribution.

Formulas and relations:

Nonequilibrium factor in the high temperature case:

Nonequilibrium factor in the low temperature case:

References

External links
 Sergey Macheret at Google Scholar

1957 births
Living people
American physicists